Can Atilla (born 1969 in Ankara), is a Turkish musician and composer of electronic, ethnic, orchestral and new age music. Graduated from Hacettepe University Ankara State Conservatory in 1990 with a BA degree in violin, he has composed several studio albums as well as numerous scores for films, plays and television series. Although his earlier works fall in the category of electronic music, starting from mid 2000s he started to compose in more traditional style and gained reputation with his epic Empire Pentalogy, which consists of 5 Ottoman-era themed albums (Cariyeler ve Geceler, 1453 - Sultanlar Aşkına, Aşk-ı Hürrem, Altın Çağ, 1453 - Fatih Aşkına) that he produced during the years between 2005 and 2012. Can Atilla is widely regarded as a pioneer in Turkish electronic and new age music.

He composed "Diriliş" (Resurrection), the official music for the 90th anniversary of the Turkish parliament in 2010. In 2016, he composed 17 tracks for the musical stage play titled Kut al-Amara Dramatic Show with Documents. The play celebrates the 100th anniversary of the Ottoman victory over the British in the Siege of Kut during the First World War.

Albums 
1992: Bilinçaltı (Subconsciousness)
1996: Kuvayi Milliye Destanı (The Epic of Independence War)
1997: Efsaneler (Legends)
1998: Ave (In Memory of Tangerine Dream)
1999: Albatros
2001: St. Florian, Dramatic Poem for Large Orchestra and Organ in memory of Anton Bruckner
2003: Waves of Wheels (Extended - Remastered Edition)
2003: Live
2004: Omni
2005: Concorde
2005: Cariyeler ve Geceler (Concubines and Nights)
2006: 1453 - Sultanlar Aşkına (1453 - For the Sultans' Sake)
2007: Aşk-ı Hürrem (The Love of Hürrem)
2008: Efsaneler (Legends)
2008: Mevlana'dan Çağrı (Rumi's Call)
2010: Altın Çağ (The Golden Age)
2011: Hi-Story
2012: 1453 - Fatih Aşkına
2013: Çanakkale 1915
2013: Leyla ile Mecnun
2013: IDEA
2014: Aşkın Gücü (Live at Congresium)
2015: Hüzn'ü Diyar Kerbela
2016: Can-ı Yunus
2017: Symphony No.2 in C minor, Gallipoli – The 57th Regiment
2017: Şems-i Rumi
2017: Hüzn-ü Diyar Kerbela
2017: Cariyeler ve Geceler
2018: Gönderilmemiş Aşk Mektupları/Şubat
2018: Berlin High School Legacy
2019: Can Atilla's Masiva (Electronic Rock Experience)
2021: Mahrem (Soundtrack)
2021: Çilehane
2022: Nazım Hikmet 120 Yaşında (Soundtrack)
2022: Resital (Solo Piano)
2022: Le Visage (Tribute to Jean Michel Jarre)

References

External links 
Official website

1969 births
Turkish electronic musicians
Living people
Musicians from Ankara
Turkish musicians